Ascot is a suburb of northern Bendigo, in the City of Greater Bendigo in the Australian state of Victoria. It was surveyed in 1874 and proclaimed a town in 1875. It is separated from the town of Epsom by the Bendigo - Echuca railway line.

References

Towns in Victoria (Australia)
Mining towns in Victoria (Australia)
Bendigo
Suburbs of Bendigo